Ippolit Petrovich Andreev was a Russian naval officer, general of the fleet, and chairman of the Main Naval Court.

Biography 
He served in the Navy after graduating from the Marine Cadet Corps since 1864. Since 1872, he served on the judicial promulgation. In 1878 he received the rank of captain-lieutenant of the Maritime Court, in 1891 - colonel, in 1896 received the rank of Major-General, and in 1904 - Lieutenant-General. He worked as chairman of the Sevastopol Naval Court. In 1907 he became a member of the Main Naval Court of the Russian Empire, in 1909 Ippolit became a general of the fleet and in 1911 he became chairman of the Main Naval Court of the Russian Empire.

Awards 
 Order of St. Alexander Nevsky
 Order of the White Eagle (Russian Empire)
 Order of St. Vladimir 2 degrees
 Order of St. Anne 1 degree
 Order of St. Stanislav 1 degree

References 

1844 births
20th-century deaths
Russian generals